Bianca Alexa Santos (born July 26, 1990) is an American actress known for her roles as Lexi Rivera in the Freeform drama series The Fosters and as Lucy Velez in the MTV comedy series Happyland. She also starred in the films Ouija (2014), The DUFF (2015), and Priceless (2016).

Early life and education 
Santos was born on July 26, 1990, in Santa Monica, California. Her father, Carlos Santos, is a Brazilian from Rio de Janeiro, and her mother, Carmen Carnot, is a Cuban from Havana. Santos is fluent in Spanish and Portuguese. She attended California Lutheran University, majoring in psychology and minoring in sociology.

Career 
In May 2013, it was announced that Santos would join the cast of the Freeform drama series The Fosters, portraying the recurring role of Lexi Rivera. Santos subsequently co-starred as Isabelle in the 2014 horror film Ouija (2014).

Santos was also cast in the lead role of Lucy Velez in MTV's comedy series Happyland. In 2015, she portrayed the best friend of Mae Whitman's character in the teen comedy film The DUFF. She has also appeared in films Priceless (2016), SPF-18 (2017) and Avenge the Crows (2017).

Filmography

Film

Television

References

External links 
 

1990 births
Living people
Actresses from Santa Monica, California
American people of Brazilian descent
American people of Cuban descent
American television actresses
American film actresses
Hispanic and Latino American actresses
California Lutheran University alumni
Actresses of Brazilian descent
21st-century American actresses
Brazilian actors
Brazilian actresses
Brazilian American